Sheila Armstrong may refer to:
 Sheila Armstrong (singer) (born 1942), English soprano
 Sheila Armstrong (fencer) (1949–2010), American fencer
 Sheila Armstrong (tennis), British tennis player in the 1950s

See also
Armstrong (surname)